Elections to Sefton Metropolitan Borough Council were held on 6 May 1999. One third of the council was up for election and the council stayed under no overall control.

After the election, the composition of the council was
Labour 30
Liberal Democrat 24
Conservative 15

Election result

References

1999 English local elections
1999
1990s in Merseyside